Sidory Zapolne  is a village in the administrative district of Gmina Jeleniewo, within Suwałki County, Podlaskie Voivodeship, in northeastern Poland.

References

Sidory Zapolne